Lizabeth (Candy) Chang, born in November 10, 1989 in Hong Kong, won Miss Chinese Toronto in 2009, and Miss Chinese International Pageant 2010 second runner-up. She was a TVB actress. Due to her cheerful and outgoing personality, and the fact that she is multilingual, she was first assigned to host several programs. She premiered on the popular TVB drama "The Hippocratic Crush" (On Call 36小時), playing the role of Kan Ching Ching 簡晶晶. Her role in The Hippocratic Crush was her first role and was critically acclaimed and she was seen by viewers to be a promising young actress and newcomer. She was nominated for Astro on Demand Awards for My Favourite Screen Couple with Nathan Ngai.

Filmography
The Hippocratic Crush (2012)
All Star Glam Exam (2011)
The Hippocratic Crush II (2013)
Bounty Lady (2013) (cameo episode 1)
Ghost Dragon of Cold Mountain (2014)
From Vegas to Macau II (2015)
Momentary Lapse Of Reason (2015)

Promotional events
Chang is a non-smoker and promoted World No-Tobacco Day.

Personal
Lizabeth (Candy) Chang aspires to be an outstanding actress. She can speak English, Mandarin, Cantonese, and Japanese, and has studied French. Her mother is from Shanghai and Chang learned Japanese from her sister due to language similarities. As an actress, she felt the scripts were rather difficult to read, partially because of her time overseas. She attended Unionville High School. She has a 3rd year university education majoring in Graphic Design and Visual Arts(from the OCAD University). Before joining the Miss Chinese International Pageant, her ambition was to be talented in the arts field. She has several hobbies/talents such as singing, reading, drawing, swimming, web designing, graphic design, travelling, dancing and playing piano.

She emigrated to Canada at age 7. She currently lives with her father. Her mother, elder brother, and elder sister are in Canada. She did some life-guarding in the past, and she claims it helped her with her role in The Hippocratic Crush. She made an appearance in The Voice: Celebrity Edition, her coach was her father who won an award in the same competition Leslie Cheung competed in. Her father is a senior voice actor.

Pageant career
She won the Miss Chinese Toronto Pageant 2009 as well as Miss Photogenic and Miss Popularity. In November 2010, she represented Toronto to compete in the Miss Chinese International Pageant 2010 and was a huge favourite reportedly due to her having one of the best body figures (perfect proportions of 35"-23"-35"). She was said by viewers to resemble the previous winner Christine Kuo and Miss Hong Kong winner 2006 Aimee Chan and was a top 5 favourite from the official poll  and was crowned second runner-up by one of the judges 黃士心. She later signed with TVB.

Pageant recognition
Miss Chinese Toronto 2009 Winner
Miss Chinese Toronto 2009 Miss Photogenic
Miss Chinese Toronto 2009 Miss Popularity
Miss Chinese International 2010 Second Runner-up

References

External links
MCI Profile
Candy's Blog
Weibo

1989 births
21st-century Hong Kong actresses
Actresses from Toronto
Hong Kong emigrants to Canada
Hong Kong film actresses
Hong Kong television actresses
Living people
Naturalized citizens of Canada
OCAD University alumni
TVB actors